Lola Taborga de Requena (1890 - 1970?) was a Bolivian modernist poet.

Works
 Cuadros Incásicos, 1952
 Espigas, 1956

References

1890 births
1970 deaths
Year of death uncertain
Bolivian women poets
Modernist poets
Modernist women writers
20th-century Bolivian poets
20th-century women writers